The 2021–22 Wagner Seahawks men's basketball team represented Wagner College during the 2021–22 NCAA Division I men's basketball season. The Seahawks were led by 10th-year head coach Bashir Mason. They played their home games at Spiro Sports Center on the school's Staten Island campus as members of the Northeast Conference.

Previous season 
In a season limited due to the ongoing COVID-19 pandemic, the Seahawks finished the season 13–7, 13–5 in NEC play to win the regular season championship. They lost in the semifinals of the NEC tournament to Mount St. Mary's. Due to the ongoing pandemic, the National Invitation Tournament was modified and, as a result, did not award bids to teams who had won their regular season championship, but failed to qualify for the NCAA tournament. The Seahawks did not receive a bid to the NIT.

Roster

Schedule and results
Following wins in the first two games of the season, the Seahawks were forced to postpone three consecutive non-conference games due to COVID-19 issues within the program. They returned to play on December 1, but were without head coach Mason and two of their leading scorers. 

NEC COVID-19 policy provided that if a team could not play a conference game due to COVID-19 issues within its program, the game would be declared a forfeit and the other team would receive a conference win. However, wins related to COVID-19 do not count pursuant to NCAA policy.

|-
!colspan=12 style=| Non-conference regular season

|-
!colspan=12 style=| NEC regular season
|-

|-
!colspan=9 style=| NEC tournament

Source

References

Wagner Seahawks men's basketball seasons
Wagner Seahawks
Wagner Seahawks men's basketball team
Wagner Seahawks men's basketball team